Clair de Lune is French for "moonlight". It may refer to:

Literature
 "Clair de Lune" (poem), a poem by Paul Verlaine published in the 1869 collection Fêtes galantes
 Clair de Lune, an 1884 short story collection by Guy de Maupassant
 Clair de lune, a 1921 play by Blanche Oelrichs, filmed in 1932
 Claire de Lune, a 1962 novel by Pierre La Mure
 "Claire de Lune", a short story by Steven Millhauser from the 2020 short story collection The Knife Thrower and Other Stories

Music

Classical music
 "Clair de lune" (Debussy), a piano piece by Debussy, third movement of his Suite bergamasque, L. 75 (1905), inspired by the Verlaine poem
 "Clair de lune" (Fauré), setting of the Paul Verlaine poem by Fauré, from his Two Songs, Op. 46 (1887)
 Clairs de lune, a set of four piano pieces, each titled "Claire de Lune", by Decaux (1907)
 Piano Sonata No. 14 (Beethoven), Op. 27, No. 2 (1801), the "Moonlight" piano sonata by Beethoven, known in French as Sonate au Clair de lune

Contemporary popular music
 "Clair de Lune" (Flight Facilities song), a 2012 song by Flight Facilities
 "Clair de Lune", a 2015 song by Little Green Cars
 "Clair de Lune", from The Epic by Kamasi Washington

Other uses
Claire de Lune (typeface), a typeface by Debriey

See also
"Au clair de la lune", a French folk song
Au clair de la lune (film), a 1983 Canadian film directed by Forcier
By the Light of the Moon (disambiguation)